Gavran is a Serbo-Croatian language surname from a nickname meaning "raven" in Serbo-Croatian. Notable people with the name include:

 Ivan Gavran (born 1980), Serbian footballer
 Luka Gavran (born 2000), Canadian soccer player
 Miro Gavran (born 1961), Croatian writer

See also
 

Serbo-Croatian-language surnames
Surnames from nicknames